Fajões is a civil parish in the municipality of Oliveira de Azeméis, Portugal. The population in 2011 was 3,087, in an area of 8.12 km2.

References

Freguesias of Oliveira de Azeméis